Casa de Rosas, also known as the Froebel Institute and the Sunshine Mission, is a historic building in the West Adams district of Los Angeles. It is the oldest women's shelter in Los Angeles.

History
The building was designed by Sumner P. Hunt and built in 1893.  It was originally an experimental kindergarten and has also been used over the years as a prestigious college preparatory school for girls, an inn and restaurant, a military barracks in World War II, the headquarters of L. Ron Hubbard's Dianetics Foundation, and a shelter for homeless women.

See also
List of Registered Historic Places in Los Angeles
List of Los Angeles Historic-Cultural Monuments in South Los Angeles

References

Buildings and structures in Los Angeles
West Adams, Los Angeles
Headquarters in the United States
Office buildings in Los Angeles
Buildings and structures on the National Register of Historic Places in Los Angeles
Los Angeles Historic-Cultural Monuments
School buildings completed in 1893
1890s architecture in the United States
Sumner Hunt buildings
1893 establishments in California